The 2018 Atlantic 10 women's basketball tournament was a postseason tournament that completed the 2017–18 season of the Atlantic 10 Conference. It was played at campus sites on February 27 for the first round, with the remaining games held on March 2–4 at the Richmond Coliseum in Richmond, Virginia.

Seeds
Teams were seeded by record within the conference, with a tiebreaker system to seed teams with identical conference records.

Schedule

*Game times in Eastern Time. #Rankings denote tournament seeding.

Bracket
 All times are Eastern.

References

See also
2018 Atlantic 10 men's basketball tournament

2017–18 Atlantic 10 Conference women's basketball season
Atlantic 10 women's basketball tournament